Urpo Pentti Korhonen (8 February 1923, Rautalampi – 10 August 2009) was a Finnish cross-country skier who competed in the 1940s and 1950s.

He was born in Rautalampi.

He won a gold medal at the 1952 Winter Olympics in Oslo in the 4 × 10 km relay.

Cross-country skiing results

Olympic Games

External links
Finland's 1952 Winter Olympic medals 
Urpo Korhonen's obituary 

1923 births
2009 deaths
People from Rautalampi
Finnish male cross-country skiers
Olympic cross-country skiers of Finland
Cross-country skiers at the 1952 Winter Olympics
Olympic gold medalists for Finland
Olympic medalists in cross-country skiing
Medalists at the 1952 Winter Olympics
Sportspeople from North Savo
20th-century Finnish people